Keraudrenia corollata is a shrub of the family Malvaceae native to inland New South Wales and Queensland in eastern Australia.

References

corollata
Flora of New South Wales
Flora of Queensland